The Cronquist system is a taxonomic classification system of flowering plants. It was developed by Arthur Cronquist in a series of monographs and texts, including The Evolution and Classification of Flowering Plants (1968; 2nd edition, 1988) and An Integrated System of Classification of Flowering Plants (1981) (see Bibliography).

Cronquist's system places flowering plants into two broad classes, Magnoliopsida (dicotyledons) and Liliopsida (monocotyledons). Within these classes, related orders are grouped into subclasses. While the scheme was widely used, in either the original form or in adapted versions, many botanists now use the Angiosperm Phylogeny Group classification for the orders and families of flowering plants, first developed in 1998. The system as laid out in Cronquist's An Integrated System of Classification of Flowering Plants (1981) counts 64 orders and 321 families in class Magnoliopsida and 19 orders and 65 families in class Liliopsida.

The Evolution and Classification of Flowering Plants 1968 (monocots) 

Class Liliatae (Monocotyledoneae)
 Subclass Alismatidae (4 orders)
 Order Alismatales
 Order Hydrocharitales
 Order Najadales
 Order Triuridales
 Subclass Commelinidae (8 orders)
 Order Commelinales
 Order Eriocaulales
 Order Restionales
 Order Juncales
 Order Cyperales
 Order Typhales
 Order Bromeliales
 Order Zingiberales
 Subclass Arecidae (4 orders)
 Order Arecales
 Order Cyclanthales
 Order Pandanales
 Order Arales
 Subclass Liliidae (2 orders)
 Order Liliales
 Family Philydraceae
 Family Pontederiaceae
 Family Liliaceae (Alluaceae, Alstroemeriaceae, Aphyllanthaceae, Amaryllidaceae, Asparagaceae, Colchicaceae, Hypoxidaceae, Melanthiaceae, Petermanniaceae, Philesiaceae, Ruscaceae, Trilliaceae)
 Family Iridaceae
 Family Agavaceae
 Family Xanthorrhoeaceae
 Family Velloziaceae
 Family Haemodoraceae (Tecophilaeceae)
 Family Taccaceae
 Family Cyanastraceae
 Family Stemonaceae (Roxburghiaceae)
 Family Smilacaceae
 Family Dioscoreaceae (Stenomeridaceae, Trichopodaceae)
 Order Orchidales
 Family Geosiridaceae
 Family Burmanniaceae (Thismiaceae)
 Family Corsiaceae
 Family Orchidaceae (Apostasiaceae)

An Integrated System of Classification of Flowering Plants 1981

Class Magnoliopsida (dicotyledons) 

Subclass Magnoliidae (mostly basal dicots)
Order Magnoliales
Winteraceae
Degeneriaceae
Himantandraceae
Eupomatiaceae
Austrobaileyaceae
Magnoliaceae (magnolia family)
Lactoridaceae
Annonaceae
Myristicaceae
Canellaceae
Order Laurales
Amborellaceae
Trimeniaceae
Monimiaceae
Gomortegaceae
Calycanthaceae
Idiospermaceae
Lauraceae (laurel family)
Hernandiaceae
Order Piperales
Chloranthaceae
Saururaceae
Piperaceae (pepper family)
Order Aristolochiales
Aristolochiaceae
Order Illiciales
Illiciaceae
Schisandraceae
Order Nymphaeales
Nelumbonaceae (lotus family)
Nymphaeaceae (waterlily family)
Barclayaceae
Cabombaceae
Ceratophyllaceae
Order Ranunculales
Ranunculaceae (buttercup family)
Circaeasteraceae
Berberidaceae
Sargentodoxaceae
Lardizabalaceae
Menispermaceae
Coriariaceae
Sabiaceae
Order Papaverales
Papaveraceae (poppy family)
Fumariaceae
Subclass Hamamelidae [sic: correctly Hamamelididae]
Order Trochodendrales
Tetracentraceae
Trochodendraceae
Order Hamamelidales
Cercidiphyllaceae
Eupteleaceae
Platanaceae
Hamamelidaceae
Myrothamnaceae
Order Daphniphyllales
Daphniphyllaceae
Order Didymelales
Didymelaceae
Order Eucommiales
Eucommiaceae
Order Urticales
Barbeyaceae
Ulmaceae
Cannabaceae (cannabis family)
Moraceae (mulberry family)
Cecropiaceae
Urticaceae
Order Leitneriales
Leitneriaceae
Order Juglandales
Rhoipteleaceae
Juglandaceae
Order Myricales
Myricaceae
Order Fagales
Balanopaceae
Ticodendraceae
Fagaceae
Nothofagaceae
Betulaceae
Order Casuarinales
Casuarinaceae
Subclass Caryophyllidae
Order Caryophyllales
Phytolaccaceae
Achatocarpaceae
Nyctaginaceae
Aizoaceae
Didiereaceae
Cactaceae (cactus family)
Chenopodiaceae
Amaranthaceae
Portulacaceae
Basellaceae
Molluginaceae
Caryophyllaceae
Order Polygonales
Polygonaceae
Order Plumbaginales
Plumbaginaceae
Subclass Dilleniidae
Order Dilleniales
Dilleniaceae
Paeoniaceae
Order Theales
Ochnaceae
Sphaerosepalaceae
Sarcolaenaceae
Dipterocarpaceae
Caryocaraceae
Theaceae (tea family)
Actinidiaceae (kiwi family)
Scytopetalaceae
Pentaphylacaceae
Tetrameristaceae
Pellicieraceae
Oncothecaceae
Marcgraviaceae
Quiinaceae
Elatinaceae
Paracryphiaceae
Medusagynaceae
Clusiaceae
Order Malvales
Elaeocarpaceae
Tiliaceae
Sterculiaceae
Bombacaceae
Malvaceae (mallow family)
Order Lecythidales
Lecythidaceae
Order Nepenthales
Sarraceniaceae
Nepenthaceae
Droseraceae
Order Violales
Flacourtiaceae
Peridiscaceae
Bixaceae
Cistaceae (rock rose family)
Huaceae
Lacistemataceae
Scyphostegiaceae
Stachyuraceae
Violaceae (violet family)
Tamaricaceae (tamarix family)
Frankeniaceae
Dioncophyllaceae
Ancistrocladaceae
Turneraceae
Malesherbiaceae
Passifloraceae (passionflower family)
Achariaceae
Caricaceae (papaya family)
Fouquieriaceae
Hoplestigmataceae
Cucurbitaceae (squash family)
Datiscaceae
Begoniaceae
Loasaceae
Order Salicales
Salicaceae
Order Capparales
Tovariaceae
Capparaceae
Brassicaceae (mustard family)
Moringaceae
Resedaceae
Order Batales
Gyrostemonaceae
Bataceae
Order Ericales
Cyrillaceae
Clethraceae
Grubbiaceae
Empetraceae
Epacridaceae
Ericaceae
Pyrolaceae
Monotropaceae
Order Diapensiales
Diapensiaceae
Order Ebenales
Sapotaceae
Ebenaceae
Styracaceae
Lissocarpaceae
Symplocaceae
Order Primulales
Theophrastaceae
Myrsinaceae
Primulaceae (primula family)
Subclass Rosidae
Order Rosales
Brunelliaceae
Connaraceae
Eucryphiaceae
Cunoniaceae
Davidsoniaceae
Dialypetalanthaceae
Pittosporaceae
Byblidaceae
Hydrangeaceae
Columelliaceae
Grossulariaceae
Greyiaceae
Bruniaceae
Anisophylleaceae
Alseuosmiaceae
Crassulaceae
Cephalotaceae
Saxifragaceae
Rosaceae (rose family)
Neuradaceae
Crossosomataceae
Chrysobalanaceae
Surianaceae
Rhabdodendraceae
Order Fabales
Mimosaceae (mimosa family)
Caesalpiniaceae
Fabaceae (legume/pea family)
Order Proteales
Elaeagnaceae
Proteaceae
Order Podostemales
Podostemaceae
Order Haloragales
Haloragaceae
Gunneraceae
Order Myrtales
Sonneratiaceae
Lythraceae
Penaeaceae
Crypteroniaceae
Thymelaeaceae
Trapaceae
Myrtaceae (myrtle family)
Punicaceae
Onagraceae
Oliniaceae
Melastomataceae
Combretaceae
Alzateaceae
Memecylaceae
Rhyncocalycaceae
Order Rhizophorales
Rhizophoraceae
Order Cornales
Alangiaceae
Nyssaceae
Cornaceae
Garryaceae
Order Santalales
Medusandraceae
Dipentodontaceae
Olacaceae
Opiliaceae
Santalaceae
Misodendraceae
Loranthaceae
Viscaceae
Eremolepidaceae
Balanophoraceae
Order Rafflesiales
Hydnoraceae
Mitrastemonaceae
Rafflesiaceae (rafflesia family)
Order Celastrales
Geissolomataceae
Celastraceae
Hippocrateaceae
Stackhousiaceae
Salvadoraceae
Aquifoliaceae
Icacinaceae
Aextoxicaceae
Cardiopteridaceae
Corynocarpaceae
Dichapetalaceae
Tepuianthaceae
Order Euphorbiales
Buxaceae (box family)
Simmondsiaceae
Pandaceae
Euphorbiaceae
Order Rhamnales
Rhamnaceae
Leeaceae
Vitaceae (grape family)
Order Linales
Erythroxylaceae
Humiriaceae
Ixonanthaceae
Hugoniaceae
Linaceae
Order Polygalales
Malpighiaceae
Vochysiaceae
Trigoniaceae
Tremandraceae
Polygalaceae
Xanthophyllaceae
Krameriaceae
Order Sapindales
Staphyleaceae
Melianthaceae
Bretschneideraceae
Akaniaceae
Sapindaceae
Hippocastanaceae
Aceraceae
Burseraceae
Anacardiaceae (cashew family)
Julianiaceae
Simaroubaceae
Cneoraceae
Meliaceae
Rutaceae (citrus family)
Zygophyllaceae
Order Geraniales
Oxalidaceae
Geraniaceae
Limnanthaceae
Tropaeolaceae
Balsaminaceae
Order Apiales
Araliaceae
Apiaceae (carrot family)
Subclass Asteridae
Order Gentianales
Loganiaceae
Retziaceae
Gentianaceae
Saccifoliaceae
Apocynaceae
Asclepiadaceae
Order Solanales
Duckeodendraceae
Nolanaceae
Solanaceae (nightshade/tomato family)
Convolvulaceae
Cuscutaceae
Menyanthaceae
Polemoniaceae
Hydrophyllaceae
Retziaceae
Order Lamiales
Lennoaceae
Boraginaceae
Verbenaceae
Lamiaceae (mint family)
Order Callitrichales
Hippuridaceae
Callitrichaceae
Hydrostachyaceae
Order Plantaginales
Plantaginaceae
Order Scrophulariales
Buddlejaceae
Oleaceae (olive family)
Scrophulariaceae
Globulariaceae
Myoporaceae
Orobanchaceae
Gesneriaceae
Acanthaceae
Pedaliaceae
Bignoniaceae
Mendonciaceae
Lentibulariaceae
Order Campanulales
Pentaphragmataceae
Sphenocleaceae
Campanulaceae (bell flower family)
Stylidiaceae
Donatiaceae
Brunoniaceae
Goodeniaceae
Order Rubiales
Rubiaceae (coffee family)
Theligonaceae
Order Dipsacales
Caprifoliaceae
Adoxaceae
Valerianaceae
Dipsacaceae
Order Calycerales
Calyceraceae
Order Asterales
Asteraceae (sunflower family)

Class Liliopsida (monocotyledons) 

Subclass Alismatidae
Order Alismatales
Butomaceae
Limnocharitaceae
Alismataceae
Order Hydrocharitales
Hydrocharitaceae
Order Najadales
Aponogetonaceae
Scheuchzeriaceae
Juncaginaceae
Potamogetonaceae
Ruppiaceae
Najadaceae
Zannichelliaceae
Posidoniaceae
Cymodoceaceae
Zosteraceae
Order Triuridales
Petrosaviaceae
Triuridaceae
Subclass Arecidae
Order Arecales
Arecaceae (palm family)
Order Cyclanthales
Cyclanthaceae
Order Pandanales
Pandanaceae (pandan family)
Order Arales
Acoraceae
Araceae
Lemnaceae
Subclass Commelinidae
Order Commelinales
Rapateaceae
Xyridaceae
Mayacaceae
Commelinaceae
Order Eriocaulales
Eriocaulaceae
Order Restionales
Flagellariaceae
Joinvilleaceae
Restionaceae
Centrolepidaceae
Order Juncales
Juncaceae
Thurniaceae
Order Cyperales
Cyperaceae
Poaceae (grass family)
Order Hydatellales
Hydatellaceae
Order Typhales
Sparganiaceae
Typhaceae
Subclass Zingiberidae
Order Bromeliales
Bromeliaceae
Order Zingiberales
Strelitziaceae
Heliconiaceae
Musaceae
Lowiaceae
Zingiberaceae (ginger family)
Costaceae
Cannaceae
Marantaceae
Subclass Liliidae
Order Liliales
Philydraceae
Pontederiaceae
Haemodoraceae
Cyanastraceae
Liliaceae (lily family)
Iridaceae (iris family)
Velloziaceae
Aloeaceae (aloe family)
Agavaceae
Xanthorrhoeaceae
Hanguanaceae
Taccaceae
Stemonaceae
Smilacaceae
Dioscoreaceae
Order Orchidales
Geosiridaceae
Burmanniaceae
Corsiaceae
Orchidaceae (orchid family)

Bibliography

 Texas A and M University Bioinformatics Working Group : Cronquist System

Work by Cronquist 

 Cronquist, Arthur. (1957). Outline of a new system of families and orders of dicotyledons. Bull. Jard. Bot. Etat Brux. 27: 13–40.
 
 
 
 
  
 
 Excerpt: Classification. 7 pp.

system, Cronquist